The Regionalliga Tirol is a third-tier division of Austrian football introduced in the 2019–20 season as one of the successor of the Austrian Regionalliga West. It covers the Austrian state of  Tyrol and is one of five leagues at this level.

2019–20 reformation
Due to high travel costs, the Vorarlberg and Tyrol clubs decide to leave the Austrian Regionalliga West and form their own Elite ligas, forcing Salzburg to do so as well. The Eliteliga were divided in a Regionalliga Salzburg, Regionalliga Tirol and Eliteliga Vorarlberg in the fall with 10 clubs each. The two best teams of these three regional leagues play in an Eliteliga play-off for promotion to the 2nd league.

Due to the COVID-19 pandemic, the 2020-21 season was halted in October 2020 with FC Kitzbühel topping the table. It was planned to resume in March 2021.

2020–21 member clubs 

 Hall
 Imst
 Kitzbühel
 Kufstein
 Reichenau
 Schwaz
 Telfs
 Wacker Innsbruck II
 Wörgl
 WSG Tirol II

References

External links
 Regionalliga Tirol at ÖFB
 Regionalliga Tirol at Ligaportal.at

West